Penelope Elsie Simmonds  is a New Zealand politician and Member of Parliament in the House of Representatives for the National Party. She previously served as the chief executive of the Southern Institute of Technology.

Early life and career
Simmonds was born in Southland and grew up in Riversdale and Te Tipua. She attended Gore High School and received a Bachelor of Science from the University of Otago. She served in the New Zealand Territorial Force for several years.

Simmonds was the chief executive of the Southern Institute of Technology (SIT) from 1997 to October 2020. During this time she implemented SIT's Zero Fees Scheme. She took leave from 29 June 2020 in order to focus on her political campaign, with deputy chief executive Maree Howden acting in her place. Upon her election to parliament she resigned her position with SIT.

Simmonds has had a close working relationship with Invercargill Mayor Tim Shadbolt, as evidenced by him consulting with her during the 2010 Invercargill mayoral election. Shadbolt attended her 2020 election night party, for which he received criticism from city councillor and former Labour MP Lesley Soper for listing it as an official mayoral engagement.

She has been a director of the Southland Museum and Art Gallery and a board member of the Southland District Health Board.

Political career

Simmonds was selected as the National Party candidate for Invercargill in May 2020 following Sarah Dowie's decision to retire. Dowie had originally been selected to run again in September 2019. Simmonds had been rumoured as a potential candidate for about fifteen years prior.

Key points of Simmonds' campaign were opposing the merging of New Zealand's polytechnics and keeping the Tiwai Point Aluminium Smelter open. During the brief National Party leadership of Todd Muller, Simmonds felt so frustrated at the lack of communication that she began instead talking to Botany candidate Christopher Luxon, seen as a potential future party leader.

In mid–November 2021, Simmonds joined her party in expressing opposition to the  Labour Government's COVID-19 Protection Framework ("traffic light system"), which she described as "confusing." She also voted against the  Government's COVID-19 Response (Vaccinations) Legislation Act 2021, claiming that the vaccine mandate would hurt businesses and the disabled.

Simmonds also opposed the Contraception, Sterilisation, and Abortion (Safe Areas) Amendment Act 2022, which established "safe zones" around abortion providers. The bill passed its third reading on 16 March 2022.

In response to a leaked report obtained by Radio New Zealand in May 2022 which identified several financial and capacity problems with the merger of the various polytechnics and industrial training organisations into the new mega polytechnic network Te Pūkenga, Simmonds in her capacity as National's tertiary education spokesperson urged the Government to abandon its polytechnic merger plans and instead invest more money into struggling institutions. Following reports of inadequate leadership, low enrollments, and a NZ$110 million deficit at Te Pūkenga, Simmonds questioned the viability of the new educational provider. She also criticised the creation of 180 administrative jobs at Te Pūkenga's Hamilton headquarters in the light of 600 projected redundancies resulting from the polytechnic merger process. Simmonds also claimed that Te Pūkenga's CEO Stephen Town's departure on "special leave" signaled significant problems with the new education provider. In mid-August 2022, Simmonds alleged that Town had been "shoulder-tapped" for the position of CEO of Te Pūkenga and lodged an Official Information Act request to identify the person who recommended Town for the executive job.

On 19 January 2023, Simmonds became the National Party's Workforce Planning spokesperson during a reshuffle of Party leader Christopher Luxon's shadow cabinet.

Personal life
Simmonds is married with three daughters. Her youngest daughter has Down's syndrome. She received a Woolf Fisher Fellowship in 2000 and was made a Companion of The New Zealand Order of Merit in the 2016 New Year Honours.

References

Living people
New Zealand National Party MPs
New Zealand MPs for South Island electorates
Members of the New Zealand House of Representatives
Women members of the New Zealand House of Representatives
21st-century New Zealand politicians
People from Southland, New Zealand
People educated at Gore High School
University of Otago alumni
Candidates in the 2020 New Zealand general election
Companions of the New Zealand Order of Merit
Southland District Health Board members
Year of birth missing (living people)
21st-century New Zealand women politicians